Eifion "Jack" A. Davies (birth year unknown) is a Welsh former rugby union and professional rugby league footballer who played in the 1940s and 1950s. He played representative level rugby union (RU) for Wales XV and Middlesex, and at club level for London Welsh RFC, Richmond F.C. and Harlequin F.C., as a centre, i.e. number 12 or 13, and representative level rugby league (RL) for Wales, and at club level for Salford (Heritage No. 465), as a goal-kicking  or usually , i.e. number 3 or 4, or 6.

Background
Jack Davies was born in Penclawdd, Swansea, Wales.

Playing career

International honours
Jack Davies represented Wales XV (RU) while at Harlequin F.C. against England in the 'Victory International' non-Test match(es) between December 1945 and April 1946, and he won caps for Wales (RL) while at Salford 1949 2-caps.

County honours
Jack Davies represented Middlesex (RU).

Club career
Jack Davies made his début for Salford against Keighley at The Willows, Salford on Saturday 1 November 1947.

Career Records
Jack Davies is one of fewer than twenty-five Welshmen to have scored more than 1000-points in their rugby league career.

References

Harlequin F.C. players
London Welsh RFC players
Middlesex County RFU players
Richmond F.C. players
Rugby league centres
Rugby league five-eighths
Rugby league players from Swansea
Rugby union centres
Rugby union players from Penclawdd
Salford Red Devils players
Wales national rugby league team players
Welsh rugby league players
Welsh rugby union players
Year of birth missing
Possibly living people